The Principality of Yaroslavl was a Rus' principality with its capital in the city of Yaroslavl. It existed from 1218 until 1463 (de jure until 1471) when it became part of the Grand Duchy of Moscow.

History

Foundation 
The Principality of Yaroslavl separated from the Grand Duchy of Vladimir-Suzdal when the sons of Konstantin Vsevolodovich divided his lands upon his death. Vsevolod Konstantinovich inherited the lands around Yaroslavl on both banks of the Volga River with its feeders — the Mologa, the Yukhot', the Ikhra, the Sit', the Sheksna and Lake Kubenskoye. 

In 1238 the city was sacked by the Mongol invasion of Kievan Rus'. In the Battle of the Sit River on March 4, 1238, Vsevolod Konstantinovich was killed and the Russians defeated. As the result, the Mongol-Tatar yoke established upon the Principality of Yaroslavl and all the Nort-East Rus' lands.

In 1262 the uprising against the Mongol tribute collectors ended in killing of all the local Tatars. The punitive attack was prevented by Alexander Nevsky, who went to the Golden Horde for negotiations.

During the Mongol-Tatar Yoke 

Later the sons of Vsevolod Konstantinovich ruled in the principality. Vasilii Vsevolodovich stayed in power from 1238-1249. His brother Konstantin Vsevolodovich ruled after his death. On 3 July, 1257, the battle of Tugova gora ended with another defeat of Russians, Konstantin Vsevolodovich was killed. Then a group of princes decided Vasilii's son-in-law should be ruler: Fedor Rostislavich Cherni, son of the ruler of Smolensk. His second wife was Anna, a daughter to the warlord Mengu-Timur.

In 1332 Ivan I of Moscow burnt down Yaroslavl under the Khan's orders. Then he forced the prince, Vasilii Davidovich Groznii to marry his daughter Yevdokia. Vasilii tried to be independent, adopting the title Grand prince and allying with Tver but the Khan ordered him to stay loyal to Moscow.

The last Grand Prince of Yaroslavl was Aleksandr Fedorovich Brukhatii who was forced to sign away the succession to Ivan III. Having emerged from the Principality of Rostov, in 14th–15th centuries it dissipated into  and was ultimately incorporated into Grand Duchy of Moscow.

Notes

Sources

Medieval Russia
Subdivisions of Kievan Rus'